So Fresh: The Hits of Summer 2015 is a compilation that features 21 songs that have charted the top 40 on the ARIA Charts. The album was released on 28 November 2014.

Track listing

Charts

Year-end charts

Certifications

References 

2015 compilation albums
So Fresh albums